Eumecostylus, or flax snails, are a genus of very large, air-breathing land snails, terrestrial pulmonate gastropod molluscs in the family Bothriembryontidae.

Species
Species within this genus include:
 Eumecostylus almiranta (Clench, 1941)
 Eumecostylus calus (E. A. Smith, 1892)
 Eumecostylus cleryi (Petit de la Saussaye, 1850)
 Eumecostylus cylindricus (Fulton, 1907)
 Eumecostylus foxi (Clench, 1950)
 Eumecostylus fraterculus (B. Rensch, 1934)
 Eumecostylus gallegoi (Clench, 1941)
 Eumecostylus gardneri Delsaerdt, 2010
 Eumecostylus hargravesi (Cox, 1871)
 Eumecostylus kirakiraensis (B. Rensch, 1934)
 Eumecostylus phenax (Clapp, 1923)
 Eumecostylus sanchristovalensis (Cox, 1870)
 Eumecostylus scottii (Cox, 1873)
 Eumecostylus uliginosus (Kobelt, 1891)
 Eumecostylus unicus (B. Rensch, 1934)
 Eumecostylus vicinus (B. Rensch, 1934)

References

 Neubert, E., Chérel-Mora C. & Bouchet P. (2009). Polytypy, clines, and fragmentation: The bulimes of New Caledonia revisited (Pulmonata, Orthalicoidea, Placostylidae). In P. Grancolas (ed.), Zoologia Neocaledonica 7. Biodiversity studies in New Caledonia. Mémoires du Muséum National d'Histoire Naturelle. 198: 37-131.
 Delsaerdt, A., 2010. Land snails on the Solomon Islands. Volume 1. Placostylidae

External links 
 J. C.; Martens, E. von. (1860). Die Heliceen nach natürlicher Verwandtschaft systematisch geordnet von Joh. Christ. Albers. Ed. 2. Pp. i-xviii, 1-359. Leipzig: Engelman
 Clench, W.J. (1941). The Land Mollusca of the Solomon Islands (Succineidae, Bulimulidae and Partulidae). American Museum Novitates. 1129: 1-21.

Bothriembryontidae
Gastropod genera